Valletta is an administrative unit and the capital of Malta. Located on the main island, between Marsamxett Harbour to the west and the Grand Harbour to the east, its population within administrative limits in 2014 was 6,444. According to the data from 2020 by Eurostat, the Functional Urban Area and metropolitan region covered the whole island and has a population of 480,134. Valletta is the southernmost capital of Europe, and at just , it is the European Union's smallest capital city.

Valletta's 16th-century buildings were constructed by the Knights Hospitaller. The city was named after Jean Parisot de Valette, who succeeded in defending the island from an Ottoman invasion during the Great Siege of Malta. The city is Baroque in character, with elements of Mannerist, Neo-Classical and Modern architecture, though the Second World War left major scars on the city, particularly the destruction of the Royal Opera House. The city was officially recognised as a World Heritage Site by UNESCO in 1980. The city has 320 monuments, all within an area of 0.55 square kilometres (0.21 sq mi), making it one of the most concentrated historic areas in the world.  Sometimes called an "open-air museum", Valletta was chosen as the European Capital of Culture in 2018. Valletta is also the sunniest city in Europe.

The city is noted for its fortifications, consisting of bastions, curtains and cavaliers, along with the beauty of its Baroque palaces, gardens and churches.

History

The peninsula was previously called Xagħret Mewwija (Mu' awiya – Meuia; named during the Arab period) or Ħal Newwija. Mewwija refers to a sheltered place. Some authors state that the extreme end of the peninsula was known as Xebb ir-Ras (Sheb point), of which name origins from the lighthouse on site. A family which surely owned land became known as Sceberras, now a Maltese surname as Sciberras. At one point the entire peninsula became known as Sceberras.

Recent scholarly studies have however shown that the Xeberras phrase is of Punic origin and means 'the headland' and 'the middle peninsula' as it actually is.

Order of Saint John

The building of a city on the Sciberras Peninsula had been proposed by the Order of Saint John as early as 1524. Back then, the only building on the peninsula was a small watchtower dedicated to Erasmus of Formia (Saint Elmo), which had been built in 1488.

In 1552, the Aragonite watchtower was demolished and the larger Fort Saint Elmo was built in its place.

In the Great Siege of 1565, Fort Saint Elmo fell to the Ottomans, but the Order eventually won the siege with the help of Sicilian reinforcements. The victorious Grand Master, Jean de Valette, immediately set out to build a new fortified city on the Sciberras Peninsula to fortify the Order's position in Malta and bind the Knights to the island. The city took his name and was called La Valletta.

The Grand Master asked the European kings and princes for help, receiving a lot of assistance due to the increased fame of the Order after their victory in the Great Siege. Pope Pius V sent his military architect, Francesco Laparelli, to design the new city, while Philip II of Spain sent substantial monetary aid. The foundation stone of the city was laid by Grand Master de Valette on 28 March 1566. He placed the first stone in what later became Our Lady of Victories Church.

In his book Dell’Istoria della Sacra Religione et Illustrissima Militia di San Giovanni Gierosolimitano, written between 1594 and 1602, Giacomo Bosio writes that when the cornerstone of Valletta was placed, a group of Maltese elders said: "Iegi zimen en fel wardia col sceber raba iesue uquie" (Which in modern Maltese reads, "Jiġi żmien li fil-Wardija [l-Għolja Sciberras] kull xiber raba' jiswa uqija", and in English, "There will come a time when every piece of land on Sciberras Hill will be worth its weight in gold").

De Valette died from a stroke on 21 August 1568 at age 74 and never saw the completion of his city. Originally interred in the church of Our Lady of the Victories, his remains now rest in St. John's Co-Cathedral among the tombs of other Grand Masters of the Knights of Malta.

Francesco Laparelli was the city's principal designer and his plan departed from medieval Maltese architecture, which exhibited irregular winding streets and alleys. He designed the new city on a rectangular grid plan, and without any collacchio (an area restricted for important buildings). His assistant was the Maltese architect Girolamo Cassar, who later oversaw the construction of the city himself after Laparelli's death in 1570.

The Ufficio delle Case regulated the building of the city as a planning authority.

The city of Valletta was mostly completed by the early 1570s, and it became the capital on 18 March 1571 when Grand Master Pierre de Monte moved from his seat at Fort St Angelo in Birgu to the Grandmaster's Palace in Valletta.

Seven Auberges were built for the Order's Langues, and these were complete by the 1580s. An eighth Auberge, Auberge de Bavière, was later added in the 18th century.

In Antoine de Paule's reign, it was decided to build more fortifications to protect Valletta, and these were named the Floriana Lines after the architect who designed them, Pietro Paolo Floriani of Macerata. During António Manoel de Vilhena's reign, a town began to form between the walls of Valletta and the Floriana Lines, and this evolved from a suburb of Valletta to Floriana, a town in its own right.

In 1634, a gunpowder factory explosion killed 22 people in Valletta. In 1749, Muslim slaves plotted to kill Grandmaster Pinto and take over Valletta, but the revolt was suppressed before it even started due to their plans leaking out to the Order. Later on in his reign, Pinto embellished the city with Baroque architecture, and many important buildings such as Auberge de Castille were remodeled or completely rebuilt in the new architectural style.

In 1775, during the reign of Ximenes, an unsuccessful revolt known as the Rising of the Priests occurred in which Fort Saint Elmo and Saint James Cavalier were captured by rebels, but the revolt was eventually suppressed.

French occupation and British rule

In 1798, the French invaded the island and expelled the Order. After the Maltese rebelled, French troops continued to occupy Valletta and the surrounding harbour area, until they capitulated to the British in September 1800. In the early 19th century, the British Civil Commissioner, Henry Pigot, agreed to demolish the majority of the city's fortifications. The demolition was again proposed in the 1870s and 1880s, but it was never carried out and the fortifications have survived largely intact.

Eventually building projects in Valletta resumed under British rule. These projects included widening gates, demolishing and rebuilding structures, widening newer houses over the years, and installing civic projects. The Malta Railway, which linked Valletta to Mdina, was officially opened in 1883. It was closed down in 1931 after buses became a popular means of transport.

In 1939, Valletta was abandoned as the headquarters of the Royal Navy Mediterranean Fleet due to its proximity to Italy and the city became a flash point during the subsequent two-year long Siege of Malta. German and Italian air raids throughout the Second World War caused much destruction in Valletta and the rest of the harbor area. The Royal Opera House, constructed at the city entrance in the 19th century, was one of the buildings lost to the raids.

Contemporary
In 1980, the 24th Chess Olympiad took place in Valletta.

The entire city of Valletta has been a UNESCO World Heritage Site since 1980, along with Megalithic Temples of Malta and the Hypogeum of Ħal-Saflieni. On 11 November 2015 Valletta hosted the Valletta Summit on Migration in which European and African leaders discussed the European migrant crisis. After that, on 27 November 2015 the city also hosted part of the Commonwealth Heads of Government Meeting 2015.

Valletta was the European Capital of Culture in 2018.

Government

Local government

The Valletta Local Council was established by the Local Councils Act of 1993, along with the other local councils of Malta. The first election was held on 20 November 1993. Other elections were held in 1996, 1999, 2002, 2005, 2008, 2013, 2017.
The present local council was elected in 2019.
The local council is housed in a building in South Street. 

The following people have served as Mayors of Valletta:
Hector Bruno (1993–1999) (PN)
Paul Borg Olivier (1999–2008) (PN)
Alexei Dingli (2008–2019) (PN)  
Christian Micallef (2019) (PN) 
Alfred Zammit (2019–) (PL)

National government

Valletta is the capital city of Malta, and is the country's administrative and commercial hub. The Parliament of Malta has been housed at the Parliament House near the city's entrance since 2015: it was previously housed at the Grandmaster's Palace in the city centre. The latter palace still houses the Office of the President of Malta, while the Auberge de Castille houses the Office of the Prime Minister of Malta. The courthouse and many government departments are also located in Valletta.

Geography

The Valletta peninsula has two natural harbours, Marsamxett and the Grand Harbour. The Grand Harbour is Malta's major port, with unloading quays at nearby Marsa. A cruise-liner terminal is located along the old seawall of the Valletta Waterfront that Portuguese Grandmaster Manuel Pinto da Fonseca built.

Climate

Valletta experiences a lack of precipitation during the summer months and most of the precipitation happens during the winter months. Winter temperatures are moderated by the surrounding sea, as a result, the city has very mild winters. The official climate recording station in Malta is at Luqa Airport, which is a few miles inland from Valletta.

Cityscape

The architecture of Valletta's streets and piazzas ranges from mid-16th century Baroque to Modernism. The city is the island's principal cultural center and has a unique collection of churches, palaces and museums and act as one of the city's main visitor attractions. When Benjamin Disraeli, future British Prime Minister, visited the city in 1830, he described it as "a city of palaces built by gentlemen for gentlemen," and remarked that "Valletta equals in its noble architecture, if it does not excel, any capital in Europe," and in other letters called it "comparable to Venice and Cádiz" and "full of palaces worthy of Palladio."

Buildings of historic importance include St John's Co-Cathedral, formerly the Conventual Church of the Knights of Malta. It has the only signed work and largest painting by Michelangelo Merisi da Caravaggio. The Auberge de Castille et Leon, formerly the official seat of the Knights of Malta of the Langue of Castille, Léon and Portugal, is now the office of the Prime Minister of Malta. The Grandmaster's Palace, built between 1571 and 1574 and formerly the seat of the Grand Master of the Knights of Malta, used to house the Maltese Parliament, now situated in a purpose-built structure at the entrance to the city, and now houses the offices of the President of Malta.

Admiralty House is a Baroque palace dating to the late 1570s. It was the official residence of the Commander-in-Chief of the Mediterranean Fleet during the British era from the 1820s onwards. From 1974 until 2016, it was the site of the National Museum of Fine Arts.

The Manoel Theatre was constructed in just ten months in 1731, by order of Grand Master António Manoel de Vilhena, and is one of the oldest working theatres in Europe. The Mediterranean Conference Centre was formerly the Sacra Infermeria. Built in 1574, it was one of Europe's most renowned hospitals during the Renaissance.

Neighbourhoods

Valletta contains a number of unofficial neighbourhoods, including:

Strada Rjali – the main thoroughfare, Triq ir-Repubblika
l-Arċipierku – an area close to the Sacra Infermeria. Its name possibly derives from archipelago since it contains a number of lanes which break up the area into many "islands" of houses, or from archi-borgo since the area is located just outside Fort Saint Elmo.
il-Baviera – an area around the English Curtain, bounded by Old Bakery, Archbishop, Marsamxett and St. Sebastian Streets. It is named after Auberge de Bavière.
il-Biċċerija – an area close to il-Baviera, named after the slaughterhouse which was formerly located there.
il-Kamrata – an area close to the Sacra Infermeria. It is named after the Camerata, a spiritual retreat which was demolished in the 19th century and replaced by social housing.
Deux Balles – an area close to il-Baviera. The name probably originates from the French occupation.
il-Fossa – an area close to the Jews' Sally Port and Fort Saint Elmo. It is regarded as the worst maintained area of Valletta.
Manderaggio – an area behind Manderaggio Curtain, bounded by St. Mark, St. Lucia, St. Patrick and Marsamxett Streets. This was meant to be a small harbour (mandracchio) but it was never completed, and a slum area developed instead. The slums were demolished in the 1950s and were rebuilt as housing estates.

Economy
Eurostat estimates the labour force in 2015 for the greater Valletta area at around 91,000 people. This corresponds to a share of just under 50 percent of Malta. As in Malta as a whole, tourism is an important economic sector. The most important tourism zone is the area surrounding the Grand Harbour. For the cruise industry, after several years of planning, work began in 2002 to build the Valletta Waterfront Project, a cruise terminal, in the Grand Harbour. There is also a publishing house in Valletta, Allied Newspapers ltd, a media company. This company publishes the two market-leading newspapers, Times of Malta and The Sunday Times of Malta.

Education
The Valletta Campus of the University of Malta is situated in the Old University Building. It serves as an extension of the Msida Campus, especially offering international masters programmes.

A church school, "St. Albert the Great", is also situated in Valletta. The Headmaster is Alternattiva Demokratika politician Mario Mallia.

Culture

Valletta was designated European Capital of Culture for 2018. The year was inaugurated with an event called Erba' Pjazez (Four Squares), with shows focused in 4 plazas in the city – Triton Square, St. George's Square, St. John's Square, and Castille Square – along with other shows in other points. This was followed by the unveiling of a public art installation, Kif Jgħid il-Malti (Maltese Sayings), which featured a number of Maltese language proverb figured in gypsum, in order to engage linguistic heritage.

Saint James Cavalier
Saint James Cavalier, originally a raised gun platform, was converted into a Centre of Creativity in the year 2000 as part of Malta's Millennium Project. It now houses a small theatre, a cinema, music rooms and art galleries. Various exhibitions are regularly held there. It has welcomed over a million visitors since opening.

Music
The Valletta International Baroque Festival is held every year in January. Jazz music in Malta was introduced in the Strait Street area, frequented by Allied sailors during both World Wars. Malta's Jazz Festival took place here. Strait Street is also known as The Gut. This area is undergoing a programme of regeneration. The city's dual band clubs are the "King's Own Band Club" and "La Valette National Philharmonic Society".

Carnival
Valletta is the scene of the Maltese Carnival, held in February leading up to Lent.
In 1823 the Valletta carnival was the scene of a human crush tragedy in which at least 110 boys perished. Suffocation of one hundred and ten boys. Extract of a private letter from Malta, of 21 February 1823. The Maltese Carnival is held every year. It is used without carnival trucks at 2020 and 2021 due to Covid, Carnival Trucks returned in 2022.

Feasts
 The feast of Our Lady of Mount Carmel is celebrated on 16 July
 Saint Paul's feast is celebrated on 10 February
 Saint Dominic's feast is celebrated in Valletta on 4 August or before
 The feast of Saint Augustine is celebrated on the third Sunday after Easter
 The city's residents also conduct an annual procession in honour of St. Rita

In Literature and the Arts
A further poem  illustrates a painting of the procession in the Strada St Giovanni painted by Samuel Prout and engraved by E. Challis is in Fisher's Drawing Room Scrap Book, 1838.

Twin towns – sister cities

Valletta is twinned with:
Palermo, Italy
Cortona, Italy, since August the 26th, 2022
Byblos, Lebanon

Transport

Malta's public transport system, which uses buses, operates mostly on routes to or from Valletta, with their central terminus just outside the city gate. Traffic within the city itself is restricted, with some principal roads being completely pedestrian areas. In 2006, a park and ride system was implemented in order to increase the availability of parking spaces in the city. People can leave their vehicles in a nearby Floriana car park and transfer to a van for the rest of the trip.

In 2007, a congestion pricing scheme was implemented to reduce long-term parking and traffic while promoting business in the city. An ANPR-based automated system takes photos of vehicles as they enter and exit the charging zone and vehicle owners are billed according to the duration of their stay.

Valletta is served by a fleet of electric taxis which transport riders from 10 points in Valletta to any destination in the city.

As of 2021, an underground Malta Metro is being planned, with a projected total cost of €6.2 billion, centred on the Valletta urban area.

Notable people

Sports
 Valletta F.C. Association Football team and Futsal team
 Valletta Lions RFC Rugby Football Union team
 Valletta's Marsamxett Harbour a "Regatta" (Rowing) Team, which takes part in the annual traditional Regatta on Victory Day (8 September).
 Valletta United W.P.C., a Water Polo Club hailing from Marsamxett side
Valletta V.C., a Volleyball club.
Marsamxett Boċċi, a ''Boċċi'' Club from Marsamxett, Valletta.
Valletta St. Paul's Boċċi, a ''Boċċi'' Club from L-Arċipierku side, Valletta.

Further reading

References

Notes

External links

 Valletta Local Council
 Valletta Living History
 Valletta, Malta’s capital city and UNESCO World Heritage Site
Old maps of Valletta from the Eran Laor Cartographic Collection, The National Library of Israel

 
Capitals in Europe
Local councils of Malta
Mediterranean port cities and towns in Malta
Populated places established in 1566
World Heritage Sites in Malta
Planned capitals
1566 establishments in Malta